This is a List of environmental dates. These dates are designated for creating awareness of environmental issues.

Species awareness days highlight biodiversity with the aim of increasing awareness about them. Some of these have been shown to lead to a rise in information seeking behaviour, and may lead to an increase in conservation fund-raising by charities and advocacy groups.

Hours
Earth Hour - 8:30pm (local time), next one will take place on 25 March 2023

Days of environment

Weeks

Years

Agriculture

Decades

See also
Index of environmental articles
List of environmental issues
Index of conservation articles
List of conservation issues
List of international environmental agreements
List of awareness days
International observance
List of commemorative days
List of commemorative months

References

External links
News & Events - UN Days, Weeks and Years
- World Plantation Day, Great Kashmir
- Save your water
- EDU Green

 
Environmental